Kimsa Qullu (Aymara kimsa three, qullu mountain, "three mountains", also spelled Quimsa Kkollu) is a  mountain in the Andes of Bolivia. It is located in the Oruro Department, Nor Carangas Province (which is identical to the Huayllamarca Municipality).

References 

Mountains of Oruro Department